In the 1983 Mediterranean Games, one of the games played was volleyball. Italy won the men's division and also won the women's division.

Medalists

Standings

Men's competition

Women's competition

External links
 Complete 1983 Mediterranean Games Standings

Sports at the 1983 Mediterranean Games
Volleyball at the Mediterranean Games
1983 in volleyball